The 2020–21 season was the 113th season of Fleetwood Town and the seventh consecutive season in League One, following their play-off semi-final defeat to Wycombe Wanderers during the previous season. Along with League One, the club also participated in the FA Cup, EFL Cup and EFL Trophy.

Background
During the previous campaign, Fleetwood finished 6th in the incomplete League One season and qualified for the play-offs. However, they were eliminated 6–3 on aggregate in the semi-finals by Wycombe Wanderers. Manager Joey Barton retained his role as manager from the previous season.

Transfers

Transfers in

Loans in

Loans out

Transfers out

Pre-season

Competitions

EFL League One

League table

Results summary

Results by matchday

Matches

The 2020–21 season fixtures were released on 21 August.

FA Cup

The draw for the first round was made on Monday 26, October.

EFL Cup

The first round draw was made on 18 August, live on Sky Sports, by Paul Merson. The draw for both the second and third round were confirmed on September 6, live on Sky Sports by Phil Babb.

EFL Trophy

The regional group stage draw was confirmed on 18 August. The second round draw was made by Matt Murray on 20 November, at St Andrew’s. The third round was made on 10 December 2020 by Jon Parkin.

Statistics
Players with names in italics and marked * were on loan from another club for the whole of their season with Bristol Rovers.

|-
!colspan=14|Players out on loan:

|-
!colspan=14|Players who left the club:

|}

Goals record

Disciplinary record

References

Fleetwood Town
Fleetwood Town F.C. seasons